CiviCRM (  C-R-M) is a web-based suite of internationalized open-source software for constituency relationship management that falls under the broad rubric of customer relationship management. It is specifically designed for the needs of non-profit, non-governmental, and advocacy groups, and serves as an association-management system.

CiviCRM is designed to manage information about an organization's donors, members, event registrants, subscribers, grant-application seekers and funders, and case contacts. Volunteers, activists, and voters - as well as more general sorts of business contacts such as employees, clients, or vendors - can be managed using CiviCRM.

Description
CiviCRM's core system tracks contacts, relationships, activities, groups, tags and permissions, while additional components keep track of contributors (CiviContribute), events (CiviEvent), member lists (CiviMember), cases (CiviCase), grants (CiviGrant), campaigns (CiviCampaign), petitions (CiviPetition), bulk mailings (CiviMail), and reports (CiviReport). These components can be activated or deactivated to meet the needs of the specific organization.

CiviCRM is deployed in conjunction with either the Backdrop CMS, Drupal, Joomla! or WordPress content management systems (CMS) and is supported by many hosting and professional services companies. Both the Drupal and Joomla! professional associations use CiviCRM. CiviCRM's license is the GNU AGPL 3.

CiviCRM's latest version supports Backdrop CMS, Drupal 7/8/9, Joomla 3.x and WordPress. There are a wide and growing number of integration modules with these CMSes to leverage their strengths. A large number of tokens are available for inclusion in HTML or plaintext emails, or for producing PDF files for printing. Data-integration formats supported include RSS, JSON, XML, and CSV. Supported programming interfaces include REST, server PHP and client JavaScript APIs, a CMS-agnostic extensions framework, and Drupal and Symfony style hooks.

Extensive administrative, developer, and user documentation is available on the project site. There is an active community chat and most community and development discussion can be found on CiviCRM's Gitlab.

CiviCRM downloads are available from both the official site, CiviCRM.org, and SourceForge, where it was 'project of the month' for January 2011.

A number of notable optional extensions have been released over the years, including an integration with the responsive open source email template builder Mosacio, the Shoreditch theme - a reimagining of the core CiviCRM user interface, and the CiviRules extension - which allows the system to apply actions based on rulesets.

Users
CiviCRM is used by many large NGOs including Amnesty International, Creative Commons, the Free Software Foundation, CERN, the Wikimedia Foundation, and KDE for their fundraising. CiviCRM is also used by Kabissa to provide CRM capabilities to over 1,500 organizations, mostly in Africa.

Other users include the Green Party of England and Wales, the Institute of Fisheries Management, the Australian Greens, and the British Association of Social Workers.

See also
 Customer relationship management
 Epesi
 SplendidCRM
 SuiteCRM
 Dolibarr
 Comparison of CRM systems
List of free and open-source software packages

References

Further reading
Various authors: CiviCRM manual. Free book (GPL) by FLOSS Manuals (1st ed. May 2009, 2nd ed. May 2010, 3rd ed. March 2011). Covers CiviCRM's core functionality for contacts (individuals, households, and organizations), relationships, and activities, as well as its four main modules: CiviContribute, CiviEvent, CiviMail, and CiviMember.
 Free online books at CiviCRM Books 
Joseph Murray and Brian Shaughnessy: Using CiviCRM. Packt Publishing. Develop and implement a fully functional, systematic CRM plan for your organization Using CiviCRM.

External links 
 
 CiviCRM on StackExchange

Customer relationship management software
Free customer relationship management software
Free software programmed in PHP
Joomla extensions
Software using the GNU AGPL license
Free database management systems